Mleccha (from Vedic Sanskrit ) is a Sanskrit term, referring to those of an incomprehensible speech, foreign or barbarous invaders as contra-distinguished from elite groups of Vedic tribes.

The word Mleccha was commonly used for foreign 'barbarians of whatever race or colour'. As a mlechchha (or mleccha), any foreigner stood outside the caste system and the ritual ambience. Thus, historically, contact with them was viewed by the Hindu as polluting. The Mleccha people were Sakas, Hunas, Yavanas, Kambojas, Pahlavas, Bahlikas and Rishikas. The Kiratas, Khas, Indo-Greeks, Pulindas, Gurjara, Scythians, Kushanas and Arabs were also mlecchas.

Etymology
The Sanskrit word mleccha does not have a standard Indo-European etymology and has no counterpart in Iranian languages. However, it has cognates in Middle Indo-Aryan languages: Pali milakkha, and Prakrit mliccha, from the latter of which originate Sindhi milis, Punjabi milech, Kashmiri brichun (weep or lament), Western Pahari melech (dirty). The Sanskrit word occurs as a verb mlecchati for the first time in the latic Vedic text Śathapatha‐Brāhmana dated to around 700 BCE. It is taken to mean "to speak indistinctly or barbarously". Brahmins are prohibited from speaking in this fashion.

As mleccha does not have an Indo-European etymology, scholars infer that it must have been a self-designation of a non-Aryan people within India. Based on the geographic references to the Mleccha deśa (Mleccha country) to the west, the term is identified with the Indus people, whose land is known from the Sumerian texts as Meluḫḫa. Asko Parpola has proposed a Dravidian derivation for "Meluḫḫa", as mel-akam ("high country", a possible reference to the Balochistan high lands).  Franklin Southworth suggests that mleccha comes from mizi meaning 'speak', or 'one's speech' derived from Proto-Dravidian for language.

Pali, the older Prakrit used by Theravada Buddhism, uses the term milakkha. It also employs milakkhu, a borrowing from a Dramatic Prakrit.

Language
Some explanations of the name "mleccha" suggest that the word was derived from the Indo-Aryan perception of the speech of the indigenous peoples. Namely, "mlech" was a word that meant "to speak indistinctly." As such, some suggest that the Indo-Aryans used an onomatopoeic sound to imitate the harshness of alien tongue and to indicate incomprehension, thus coming up with "mleccha".

Early Indo-Aryans spoke Sanskrit, which evolved into the various local modern Sanskrit-derived languages. Sanskrit was believed to include all the sounds necessary for communication. Early Indo-Aryans would therefore dismiss other languages as foreign tongue, "mleccha bhasha".  As the Sanskrit word itself suggests, "mlecchas" were those whose speech was alien. "Correct speech" was a crucial component of being able to take part in the appropriate yajnas (religious rituals and sacrifices). Thus, without correct speech, one could not hope to practice correct religion, either.

The notion of being Arya suggested a knowledge of Sanskrit in order to effectively perform ritual hymns; thus suggesting the importance of language. Parasher discusses the importance of knowing the correct speech in order to perform sacrifice and ritual in the religion of the brahmanas. Parasher continued that: "The best experts of the sacrificial art were undoubtedly the various families of the Brahmins who, placed in a hierarchy within the Indo-Aryan social system, became the upholders of pure and best speech".

Historians note that early Indo-Aryans believed Sanskrit to be the superior language over all other forms of speech. As such, mleccha or barbarian speech was said to have meant any of the following: "1) a language which was not necessarily alien, but the speech of the person or persons was improper because it was either hostile or vulgar; 2) a language, and here most probably Sanskrit, that was mispronounced and, thereby, incomprehensible: 3) finally, any foreign tongue which was naturally incomprehensible because it was unintelligible to those who did not understand a particular language".

Territory
Historians have stated that the notion of foreigners in ancient India – those living outside of the Indian subcontinent – was often accompanied by the idea that one was a barbarian. Still, it seemed that groups who did not come from outside of these areas, as well as foreigners, were designated by the term mleccha, which carried with it a barbarian connotation.

Thus another distinction that was made between the mlecchas and non-mlecchas was area of habitation. Though they were considered a marginal group, the area characterize as the mleccha-desa (the natural border that separated their lands from that of the Aryans) was never permanent. Instead, it was defined by the changing ideas about the Āryāvarta. Parasher noted that "the only consistent areas dubbed as mleccha desa were those regions inhabited by 'primitive tribes' who for long periods of time did not come under the sway of the Brahmanical, Buddhist or Jaina influence".

Though the area of the Aryas expanded with time, the notion that was held over all of the land was that of "purity." As Vedic literature refers only to the places and territories that were familiar to the Indo-Aryans, these lands eventually became part of the Āryāvarta. Parasher thus indicates that the Āryāvarta was designated as "[t]he region where the river Sarasvati disappears is the Patiala district in Punjab. The Pariyatra mountains belong to the Vindhya range, probably the hills of Malwa. The Kalakavana is identified with a tract somewhere near Prayaga." Still, other interpretations of the Āryāvarta refer to those areas where the black antelope roams, for these areas are fit for the performance of sacrifice. Early Vedic literature focused on defining the area of habitation of the aryas for this land was considered pure; yet there is no actual reference to the mleccha country or behavior. Wherever the territory, though, the implications of naming such lands as the Aryavarta is that any lands excluded from that area were considered impure.

Further, there is evidence that Indians of the Vedic period actually had contact with people outside of the subcontinent, namely the Persians. The Persians, who ruled over the Indus river valley during this time (522–486 BC) were not designated as mleccha, perhaps because they did not interfere with the brahminical way of life.

Later Vedic literature speaks of the western Anava tribes as mlecchas and occupying northern Punjab, Sindh and eastern Rajasthan. The tribes of the north were mlecchas either because they were located on the frontiers such as Gandhara, Kashmira and Kambojas and therefore both their speech and culture had become contaminated and differed from that of Āryāvarta, or else, as in the case of southern India, they were once Aryas but having forsaken the Vedic rituals were regarded to mleccha status.

Cultural behavior
The word mleccha emerged as a way for the ancient Hindus to classify those who did not subscribe to the "traditional value system," though the characteristics of the so-called system were ambiguous. In sum, though, the idea was that the mlecchas were peoples who did not conform to what was culturally acceptable.

Early writings refer to these foreign peoples as "half-civilized, unconverted people who rise or eat at improper times." They stated that monks and nuns should avoid certain areas of habitation because they were unsafe. Namely, that "the ignorant populace might beat, harass, rob them under the impression that they were spies from hostile villages." Further, while some of these non-mlecchas, such as those of the Jaina faith, had established contact with people of the forest tribes, they were automatically designated as mlecchas. This was the typical attitude of people from the plains who took pride in their norms of settled agricultural and urban lifestyles.

Historians note that there were also systems in place to determine the validity – or "purity" – of certain customs, which would ultimately be judged by the Priest. As such there were intricate rules in place to define purity from impurity, laws of behavior, as well as rituals and customs, in an effort to educate the members of the Brahmanical system. Namely, these advisors took great pains to ensure that peoples of the Brahmanical system did not subscribe to any mleccha customs or rituals.

The Sanskrit-ization of names was a common feature among both indigenous and foreign mlecchas who slowly tried to move away from their status of mleccha. Very often, in the case of ruling families, it took one to two generations to make a transition. One of the most direct forms of the expression of the Brahmanical ritual purity was the form and type of food which a Brahmin could eat. He was forbidden to accept cooked food from any unclean person. Thus when the Punjab region became a mleccha area conquered by Muslims, the staple food was given a lower place in the food-ranking. By the twelfth century AD, wheat was described in one lexicon as 'food of the mlecchas', and rice became the 'pure' cereal. Onions and garlic was also regarded as the food of the mlecchas and therefore prohibited to the priestly intellectual class of Brahmins. Mlecchas drank alcohol, ate cow flesh, which was strictly forbidden to a follower of Hindu orthopraxy, and believed in false gods.

"And the whole world will be filled with mleccha behavior and notions and ceremonies, and sacrifices will cease and joy will be nowhere and general rejoicing will disappear.[...] And, O Yudhishthira, the whole world will be mlecchified. And men will cease to gratify the gods by offerings of Sraddhas. And no one will listen to the words of others and no one will be regarded as a preceptor by another. And, O ruler of men, intellectual darkness will envelop the whole earth."

Literature describing the Mleccha
In the Mahabharata, some Mleccha warriors are described as having "heads completely shaved or half-shaved or covered with matted locks, [as being] impure in habits, and of crooked faces and noses  They are "dwellers of hills" and "denizens of mountain-caves. Mlecchas were born of the cow (belonging to Vasishtha), of fierce eyes, accomplished in smiting looking like messengers of Death, and all conversant with the deceptive powers of the Asuras".

Swami Parmeshwaranand states the mleccha tribe was born from the tail of the celestial cow Nandini, kept by Vashishta for sacrificial purposes when there was a fight between Vishvamitra and Vasistha. The Mahabharata gives the following information regarding them:
 Mleccha who sprang up from the tail of the celestial cow Nandini sent the army of Viswamitra flying in terror.
 Bhagadatta was the king of mlecchas.
 Pandavas, like Bhima, Nakula and Sahadeva once defeated them.
 Karna during his world campaign conquered many mleccha countries.
 The wealth that remained in the Yagasala of Yudhishthira after the distribution as gifts to Brahmins was taken away by the mlecchas.
 The mlecchas drove angered elephants on the army of the Pandavas.
 "This shows mlecchas were against Pandavas".

The term is not attested in the Vedas, but occurs for the first time in the late Vedic text the Shatapatha Brahmana. The Baudhayana sutras define a mleccha as someone "who eats beef or indulges in self-contradictory statements or is devoid of righteousness and purity of conduct".

Medieval Hindu literature, such as that of Chaitanya Mahaprabhu, also uses the term to refer to those of larger groups of other religions, especially Muslims. In medieval India, a foreign visitor al-Biruni (died 1048) noted that foreigners were regarded as 'unclean' or 'Mleccha' and Hindus were forbidden any social or matrimonial contact with them.

According to the Gwalior inscription of his descendant Mihira Bhoja, the Gurjara-Pratihara dynasty ruler Nagabhata I repulsed a mleccha invasion. These mlechchhas are identified with the Arab Muslim invaders.

See also
 Barbarian
 Meluhha
 Dasa
 Mlechchha dynasty
 Yona

Notes

References

Bibliography

External links

Ethnic and religious slurs
Ethno-cultural designations